Alex Coles is a critic and editor. DesignArt (Tate Publishing, 2005), his first book, triggered a debate about limited edition design. Coles then edited the anthology Design and Art (MIT Press/Whitechapel Publications, 2007), which argued for a deeper understanding of the interface between art and design. The Transdisciplinary Studio (Sternberg Press, 2012) and the EP (Sternberg Press 2013-) series followed.

In 2018 Coles began writing about music, leading to Crooner (Reaktion, 2023) and Tainted Love: From Nina Simone to Kendrick Lamar (Sternberg Press, 2023).

Publications 
Edited books include: 
Site-Specificity: The Ethnographic Turn (Black Dog Publishing, 2001), Design and Art (MIT Press/Whitechapel Publications, 2007), and EP (Sternberg Press, 2013-) Vol 1, 2, 3.

Academic posts 
In November 2011, Coles was appointed Professor of Transdisciplinary Studies, School of Art, Design and Architecture, University of Huddersfield.

External links 
 Artforum.com
 The Bathroom Critic 
 Art's Little Brother in Icon Magazine Online
 Eye Magazine | Review | The friends of Eddie Russia
 Eye Magazine | Feature | Cover version

English art critics
English art historians
Living people
1971 births
Alumni of Loughborough University